The 2006 DirecTV 500 was the sixth race of the 2006 NASCAR Nextel Cup season. It was held on April 2, 2006 at Martinsville Speedway in Ridgeway, Virginia.  Jimmie Johnson won the pole and Tony Stewart led the most laps and won the race.

Background

Its turns are banked at 11° while the frontstretch, where the start/finish line is located, is banked 0°. Like the front stretch, the backstraightaway also does not have a banked surface.

Martinsville Speedway is the shortest track on the Sprint Cup circuit,  but because of its size and shape – described most often as the shape of a paperclip – Martinsville offers some of the most exciting and close racing in the sport. Also because of its size, fans are closer to the action than any other track. The cars are never more than a few hundred yards away and sometimes they seem close enough to reach out and touch.

In a recent poll of race fans by a major publication, Martinsville Speedway was voted as the top bargain in all of Sprint Cup racing as well as the track having the best view of the action. The track is also one of the most modern, with high-rise aluminum chair back seating, corporate and fan suites and state-of-the-art facilities for the media.

The race track was built in 1947 and is owned by the International Speedway Corporation.

Jeff Gordon was the defending race winner, after he won the race in 2005, the previous year.

Qualifying

Race results

Failed to qualify: Derrike Cope (#74), Kevin Lepage (#61), Kenny Wallace (#78), Jimmy Spencer (#49), Morgan Shepherd (#89), Hermie Sadler

References

DirecTV 500
DirecTV 500
NASCAR races at Martinsville Speedway
April 2006 sports events in the United States